Denys Cazet is a French-American illustrator and writer of at least 25 children's picture books, including the Minnie and Moo series for beginning readers.

Cazet was born in California and lives there with his family. He worked more than 25 years at elementary school, primarily as a teacher.

Works 
The Perfect Pumpkin Pie
Minnie and Moo series

References

External links 
 

1938 births
American children's book illustrators
American children's writers
American people of French descent
Living people
Date of birth missing (living people)
Place of birth missing (living people)